Rungwa is a Bantu language of the Rukwa Region of western Tanzania.

References

Rukwa languages